Neo-Vedanta, also called Hindu modernism, neo-Hinduism, Global Hinduism and Hindu Universalism, are terms to characterize interpretations of Hinduism that developed in the 19th century. The term "Neo-Vedanta" was coined by German Indologist Paul Hacker, in a pejorative way, to distinguish modern developments from "traditional" Advaita Vedanta.

Scholars have repeatedly argued that these modern interpretations incorporate Western ideas into traditional Indian religions, especially Advaita Vedanta, which is asserted as central or fundamental to Hindu culture. Other scholars have described a Greater Advaita Vedānta, which developed since the medieval period. Drawing on this broad pool of sources, after Muslim rule in India was replaced by that of the East India Company, Hindu religious and political leaders and thinkers responded to Western colonialism and orientalism, contributing to the Indian independence movement and the modern national and religious identity of Hindus in the Republic of India. This societal aspect is covered under the term of Hindu reform movements.

Among the main proponents of such modern interpretations of Hinduism were Vivekananda, Aurobindo and Radhakrishnan, who to some extent also contributed to the emergence of Neo-Hindu movements in the West.

Neo-Vedanta has been influential in the perception of Hinduism, both in the west and in the higher educated classes in India. It has received appraisal for its "solution of synthesis", but has also been criticised for its Universalism. The terms "Neo-Hindu" or "Neo-Vedanta" themselves have also been criticised for its polemical usage, the prefix "Neo-" then intended to imply that these modern interpretations of Hinduism are "inauthentic" or in other ways problematic.

Definition and etymology
According to Halbfass, the terms "Neo-Vedanta" and "Neo-Hinduism" refer to "the adoption of Western concepts and standards and the readiness to reinterpret traditional ideas in light of these new, imported and imposed modes of thought". Prominent in Neo-Vedanta is Vivekananda, whose theology, according to Madaio, is often characterised in earlier scholarship as "a rupture from 'traditional' or 'classical' Hindusim, particularly the 'orthodox' Advaita Vedanta of the eighth century Shankara."

The term "Neo-Vedanta" appears to have arisen in Bengal in the 19th century, where it was used by both Indians and Europeans. 
Brian Hatcher wrote that "the term neo-Vedanta was first coined by Christian commentators, some of whom were firsthand observers of developments in Brahmo theology... engaged in open, sometimes acrimonious debates with the Brahmos, whom they partly admired for their courage in abandoning traditions of polytheism and image worship but whom they also scorned for having proffered to other Hindus a viable alternative to conversion".
Halbfass wrote that "it seems likely" that the term "Neo-Hinduism" was invented by a Bengali, Brajendra Nath Seal (1864–1938), who used the term to characterise the literary work of Bankim Chandra Chatterjee (1838–1894).

The term "neo-Vedanta" was used by Christian missionaries as well as Hindu traditionalists to criticize the emerging ideas of the Brahmo Samaj, a critical usage whose "polemical undertone [...] is obvious".

Ayon Maharaj regards the continued scholarly use of the term "Neo-Vedanta" as only a "seemingly benign practice". 
Maharaj asserts that the term Neo-Vedanta "is misleading and unhelpful for three main reasons":

The term "neo-Hinduism" was used by a Jesuit scholar resident in India, Robert Antoine (1914–1981), from whom it was borrowed by Paul Hacker, who used it to demarcate these modernist ideas from "surviving traditional Hinduism," and treating the Neo-Advaitins as "dialogue partners with a broken identity who cannot truly and authentically speak for themselves and for the Indian tradition". Hacker made a distinction between "Neo-Vedanta" and "neo-Hinduism", seeing nationalism as a prime concern of "neo-Hinduism".

History
Although neo-Vedanta proper developed in the 19th century in response to Western colonialism, it has got deeper origins in the Muslim period of India. Michael s. Allen and Anand Venkatkrishnan note that Shankara is very well-studies, but "scholars have yet to provide even a rudimentary, let alone comprehensive account of the history of Advaita Vedanta in the centuries leading up to the colonial period."

"Greater Advaita Vedanta"

Unification of Hinduism

Well before the advent of British influence, with beginnings that some scholars have argued significantly predate Islamic influence,<ref
    name=allen14></ref><ref
   name=leach11></ref> hierarchical classifications of the various orthodox schools were developed. According to Nicholson, already between the twelfth and the sixteenth century,

The tendency of "a blurring of philosophical distinctions" has also been noted by Mikel Burley. Lorenzen locates the origins of a distinct Hindu identity in the interaction between Muslims and Hindus, and a process of "mutual self-definition with a contrasting Muslim other", which started well before 1800. Both the Indian and the European thinkers who developed the term "Hinduism" in the 19th century were influenced by these philosophers.

Within these so-called doxologies Advaita Vedanta was given the highest position, since it was regarded to be most inclusive system. Vijnanabhiksu, a 16th-century philosopher and writer, is still an influential proponent of these doxologies. He's been a prime influence on 19th century Hindu modernists like Vivekananda, who also tried to integrate various strands of Hindu thought, taking Advaita Vedanta as its most representative specimen.

Influence of yogic tradition
While Indologists like Paul Hacker and Wilhelm Halbfass took Shankara's system as the measure for an "orthodox" Advaita Vedanta, the living Advaita Vedanta tradition in medieval times was influenced by, and incorporated elements from, the yogic tradition and texts like the Yoga Vasistha and the Bhagavata Purana. The Yoga Vasistha became an authoritative source text in the Advaita vedanta tradition in the 14th century, while Vidyāraņya's Jivanmuktiviveka (14th century) was influenced by the (Laghu-)Yoga-Vasistha, which in turn was influenced by Kashmir Shaivism. Vivekananda's 19th century emphasis on nirvikalpa samadhi was preceded by medieval yogic influences on Advaita Vedanta. In the 16th and 17th centuries, some Nath and hatha yoga texts also came within the scope of the developing Advaita Vedanta tradition.

Company rule in India and Hindu reform movements

Company rule in India 
The influence of the Islamic Mughal Empire on the Indian subcontinent was gradually replaced with that of the East India Company, leading to a new era in Indian history. Prior to the establishment of Company rule, Mughal rule in Northern India had a drastic effect on Hinduism (and Buddhism) through various acts of persecution. While Indian society was greatly impacted by Mughal rule, the Mughal economy however continued to remain one of the largest in the world, thanks in large part to its proto-industrialization. Muslim rule over Southern India was also relatively short-lived before the 17th century. The policies of the East India Company coincided with the decline of proto-industrialization in former Mughal territories. The economic decline caused in part by restrictive Company policies in their Indian territories and the Industrial Revolution in Europe led to the eventual dismantlement of the dominant decentralized education systems in India in the tail end of the 18th century. The new education system drafted by the East India Company emphasized Western culture at the expense of Indian cultures. The East India Company was also involved in supporting the activities of Protestant missionaries in India, particularly after 1813. These missionaries frequently expressed anti-Hindu sentiments, in line with their Christian ways of thinking.

Hindu reform movements
In response to Company rule in India and the dominance of Western culture, Hindu reform movements developed, propagating societal and religious reforms, exemplifying what Percival Spear has called

Neo-Vedanta, also called "neo-Hinduism" is a central theme in these reform-movements. The earliest of these reform-movements was Ram Mohan Roy's Brahmo Samaj, who strived toward a purified and monotheistic Hinduism.

Major proponents
Neo-vedanta's main proponents are the leaders of the Brahmo Samaj, especially Ram Mohan Royis the main proponents of neo-Hinduism.

Ram Mohan Roy and the Brahmo Samaj

The Brahmo Samaj was the first of the 19th century reform movements. Its founder, Ram Mohan Roy (1772–1833), strived toward a universalistic interpretation of Hinduism. He rejected Hindu mythology, but also the Christian trinity. He found that Unitarianism came closest to true Christianity, and had a strong sympathy for the Unitarians. He founded a missionary committee in Calcutta, and in 1828 asked for support for missionary activities from the American Unitarians. By 1829, Roy had abandoned the Unitarian Committee, but after Roy's death, the Brahmo Samaj kept close ties to the Unitarian Church, who strived towards a rational faith, social reform, and the joining of these two in a renewed religion. The Unitarians were closely connected to the Transcendentalists, who were interested in and influenced by Indian religions early on.

Rammohan Roy's ideas were "altered ... considerably" by Debendranath Tagore, who had a Romantic approach to the development of these new doctrines, and questioned central Hindu beliefs like reincarnation and karma, and rejected the authority of the Vedas. Tagore also brought this "neo-Hinduism" closer in line with Western esotericism, a development which was furthered by Keshubchandra Sen. Sen was influenced by Transcendentalism, an American philosophical-religious movement strongly connected with Unitarianism, which emphasized personal religious experience over mere reasoning and theology. Sen strived to "an accessible, non-renunciatory, everyman type of spirituality", introducing "lay systems of spiritual practice" which can be regarded as prototypes of the kind of Yoga-exercises which Vivekananda populurized in the west.

The theology of the Brahmo Samaj was called "neo-Vedanta" by Christian commentators, who "partly admired [the Brahmos] for their courage in abandoning traditions of polytheism and image worship, but whom they also scorned for having proffered to other Hindus a viable alternative to conversion". Critics accused classical Vedanta of being "cosmic self-infatuation" and "ethical nihilism". Brahmo Samaj leaders responded to such attacks by redefining the Hindu path to liberation, making the Hindu path available to both genders and all castes, incorporating "notions of democracy and worldly improvement".

Gandhi

Gandhi (1869–1948) has become a worldwide hero of tolerance and striving toward freedom. In his own time, he objected to the growing forces of Indian nationalism, communalism and the subaltern response. Gandhi saw religion as a uniting force, confessing the equality of all religions. He synthesized the Astika, Nastika and Semitic religions, promoting an inclusive culture for peaceful living. Gandhi pled for a new hermeneutics of Indian scriptures and philosophy, observing that "there are ample religious literature both in Astika and Nastika religions supporting for a pluralistic approach to religious and cultural diversity".

The orthodox Advaita Vedanta, and the heterodox Jain concept Anekantavada provided him concepts for an "integral approach to religious pluralism". He regarded Advaita as a universal religion ("dharma") which could unite both the orthodox and nationalistic religious interpretations, as the subaltern alternatives. Hereby Gandhi offers an interpretation of Hindutva which is basically different from the Sangh Parivar-interpretation. The concept of anekantavada offered Gandhi an axiom that "truth is many-sided and relative". It is "a methodology to counter exclusivism or absolutism propounded by many religious interpretations". It has the capability of synthesizing different percpetions of reality. In Gandhi's view,

Anekantavada also gives room to an organic understanding of "spatio-temporal process", that is, the daily world and its continued change. The doctrine of anekantavada is a plea for samvada, "dialogue", and an objection against proselytizing activities.

Maa Anandamayi

Maa Anandamayi was a major force in the further popularization of Neo-Vedanta. As a schoolboy, Maa Anandamayi was inspired by Vivekananda's lectures, in which he found "an ennobling vision of truth and harmony as well as a message of Indian pride". She was educated by Christian missionaries, and wrote a master thesis on Vedanta and ethics. She presented her view of Hinduism as the view of Hinduism.Central in his presentation was the claim that religion is fundamentally a kind of experience, anubhava, reducing religion "to the core experience of reality in its fundamental unity". For Maa Anandamayi, Vedanta was the essence and bedrock of religion.

Philosophy

Politics

Nationalism

Vivekananda "occupies a very important place" in the development of Indian nationalism as well as Hindu nationalism, and has been called "the prophet of nationalism", pleading for a "Hindu regeneration". According to S.N. Sen, his motto "Arise, Awake and do not stop until the goal is reached" had a strong appeal for millions of Indians. According to Bijoy Misra, a private blogger,

Social activism

According to Bijoy Misra, a private blogger,

Religion

Unity of Hinduism
Neo-Vedanta aims to present Hinduism as a "homogenized ideal of Hinduism" with Advaita Vedanta as its central doctrine. It presents

Neo-Vedanta was influenced by Oriental scholarship, which portrayed Hinduism as a "single world religion", and denigrated the heterogeneity of Hindu beliefs and practices as 'distortions' of the basic teachings of Vedanta.

Universalism

Following Ramakrishna, neo-Vedanta regards all religions to be equal paths to liberation, but also gives a special place to Hinduism, as the ultimate universal religion. The various religious faiths of the world are regarded to help people to attain God-realization, the experience of God or the Ultimate. According to some authors, this is expressed in the Rig Veda, "Truth is one; only It is called by different names," The Ramakrishna/Vivekananda movement has these concepts to popular awareness in India and the West. An example is Aldous Huxley's book, The Perennial Philosophy, in which are gathered quotes from the religions of the world that express, for him, the universality of religion by showing the same fundamental Truths are found in each of the world's religions.

Vedanta and nondualism

According to Benavides, neo-Vedanta is closer to Ramanuja's qualified non-dualism than it is to Shankara Advaita Vedanta. Nicholas F. Gier notes that neo-Vedanta does not regard the world to be illusionary, in contrast to Shankara's Advaita.

According to Michael Taft, Ramakrishna reconciled the dualism of formless and form. Ramakrishna regarded the Supreme Being to be both Personal and Impersonal, active and inactive. According to Anil Sooklal, Vivekananda's neo-Advaita "reconciles Dvaita or dualism and Advaita or non-dualism".

Radhakrishnan acknowledged the reality and diversity of the world of experience, which he saw as grounded in and supported by the absolute or Brahman. Radhakrishnan also reinterpreted Shankara's notion of maya. According to Radhakrishnan, maya is not a strict absolute idealism, but "a subjective misperception of the world as ultimately real".

Gandhi endorsed the Jain concept of Anekantavada, the notion that truth and reality are perceived differently from diverse points of view, and that no single point of view is the complete truth. This concept embraces the perspectives of both Vedānta which, according to Jainism, "recognizes substances but not process", and Buddhism, which "recognizes process but not substance". Jainism, on the other hand, pays equal attention to both substance (dravya) and process (paryaya).

According to Sarma, who stands in the tradition of Nisargadatta Maharaj, Advaitavāda means "spiritual non-dualism or absolutism", in which opposites are manifestations of the Absolute, which itself is immanent and transcendent.

Sruti versus "experience"

A central concern in Neo-Vedanta is the role of sruti, sacred texts, versus (personal) experience. Classical Advaita Vedanta is centered on the correct understanding of sruti, the sacred texts. Correct understanding of the sruti is a pramana, a means of knowledge to attain liberation. It takes years of preparation and study to accomplish this task, and includes the mastery of Sanskrit, the memorisation of texts, and the meditation over the interpretation of those texts. Understanding is called anubhava, knowledge or understanding derived from (personal) experience. Anubhava removes Avidya, ignorance, regarding Brahman and Atman, and leads to moksha, liberation. In neo-Vedanta, the status of sruti becomes secondary, and "personal experience" itself becomes the primary means to liberation.

Smarta tradition

According to Ninian Smart, Neo-Vedanta is "largely a smarta account." In modern times Smarta-views have been highly influential in both the Indian and Western understanding of Hinduism. According to iskcon.org, 

Vaitheespara notes adherence of Smartha Brahmans to "the pan-Indian Sanskrit-Brahmanical tradition":

The majority of members of Smarta community follow the Advaita Vedanta philosophy of Shankara. Smarta and Advaita have become almost synonymous, though not all Advaitins are Smartas. Shankara was a Smarta, just like Radhakrishnan. Smartas believe in the essential oneness of five (panchadeva) or six (Shanmata) deities as personifications of the Supreme. According to Smartism, supreme reality, Brahman, transcends all of the various forms of personal deity. God is both Saguna and Nirguna:

Lola Williamson further notes that "what is called Vedic in the smarta tradition, and in much of Hinduism, is essentially Tantric in its range of deities and liturgical forms."

Influence
Neo-Vedanta was popularised in the 20th century in both India and the west by Vivekananda, Sarvepalli Radhakrishnan, and Western orientalists who regarded Vedanta to be the "central theology of Hinduism".

Vedanticization
Neo-Vedanta has become a broad current in Indian culture, extending far beyond the Dashanami Sampradaya, the Advaita Vedanta Sampradaya founded by Adi Shankara. The influence of Neo-Vedanta on Indian culture has been called "Vedanticization" by Richard King.

An example of this "Vedanticization" is Ramana Maharshi, who is regarded as one of the greatest Hindu-saints of modern times,, of whom Sharma notes that "among all the major figures of modern Hinduism [he] is the one person who is widely regarded as a jivanmukti". Although Sharma admits that Ramana was not acquainted with Advaita Vedanta before his personal experience of liberation, and Ramana never received initiation into the Dashanami Sampradaya or any other sampradaya, Sharma nevertheless sees Ramana's answers to questions by devotees as being within an Advaita Vedanta framework.

Diversity and pluralism
In response to the developments in India during the colonial era and Western critiques of Hinduism, various visions on Indian diversity and unity have been developed within the nationalistic and reform movements.

The Brahmo Samaj strived towards monotheism, while no longer regarding the Vedas as sole religious authority. The Brahmo Samaj had a strong influence on the Neo-Vedanta of Vivekananda, Aurobindo, Radhakrishnan and Gandhi, who strived toward a modernized, humanistic Hinduism with an open eye for societal problems and needs. Other groups, like the Arya Samaj, strived toward a revival of Vedic authority. In this context, various responses toward India's diversity developed.

Hindu inclusivism – Hindutva and "Dharmic religions"
In modern times, the orthodox measure of the primacy of the Vedas has been joined with the 'grand narrative' of the Vedic origins of Hinduism. The exclusion of Jainism and Buddhism excludes a substantial part of India's cultural and religious history from the assertion of a strong and positive Hindu identity. Hindutva-ideology solves this problem by taking recourse to the notion of Hindutva, "Hinduness", which includes Jainism and Buddhism. A recent strategy, exemplified by Rajiv Malhotra, is the use of the term dharma as a common denominator, which also includes Jainism and Buddhism.

According to Larson, Malhotra's notion of "the so-called "Dharma” traditions" and their "integral unity" is another example of "neo-Hindu discourse". Malhotra, in his Being Different, uses the term "Dharmic tradition" or "dharmic systems", "referring to all the Hindu, Buddhist, Jaina and Sikh traditions". He proposes that those traditions, despite their differences, share common features, the most important being "Dharma". They are also characterised by the notion of "Integral Unity", which means that "ultimately only the whole exists; the parts that make up the whole have but a relative existence. The whole is independent and indivisible", as opposed to "Synthetic Unity", which "starts with parts that exist separately from one another". Malhotra has received strong criticism of his ideas, for 'glossing over' the differences between and even within the various traditions of India.

In response, Malhotra explains that some of his critics confused "integral unity" with "homogeneity", thinking that Malhotra said all those traditions are essentially the same, when he actually wrote that Dharmic traditions share a sense of an "integral unity" despite differences.

Inclusivism and communalism
According to Rinehart, neo-Vedanta is "a theological scheme for subsuming religious difference under the aegis of Vedantic truth". According to Rinehart, the consequence of this line of reasoning is Communalism, the idea that "all people belonging to one religion have common economic, social and political interests and these interests are contrary to the interests of those belonging to another religion." Communalism has become a growing force in Indian politics, presenting several threats to India, hindring its nation-building and threatening "the secular, democratic character of the Indian state".

Rinehart notes that Hindu religiosity plays an important role in the nationalist movement, and that "the neo-Hindu discource is the unintended consequence of the initial moves made by thinkers like Rammohan Roy and Vivekananda." But Rinehart also points out that it is

Influence on Western spirituality

Neo-Vedanta has been influenced by Western ideas, but has also had a reverse influence on Western spirituality.  Due to the colonisation of Asia by the Western world, since the late 18th century an exchange of ideas has been taking place between the Western world and Asia, which also influenced Western religiosity. In 1785 appeared the first Western translation of a Sanskrit-text. It marked the growing interest in the Indian culture and languages. The first translation of Upanishads appeared in two parts in 1801 and 1802, which influenced Arthur Schopenhauer, who called them "the consolation of my life". Early translations also appeared in other European languages.

A major force in the mutual influence of eastern and Western ideas and religiosity was the Theosophical Society. It searched for ancient wisdom in the east, spreading eastern religious ideas in the west. One of its salient features was the belief in "Masters of Wisdom", "beings, human or once human, who have transcended the normal frontiers of knowledge, and who make their wisdom available to others". The Theosophical Society also spread western ideas in the east, aiding a modernisation of eastern traditions, and contributing to a growing nationalism in the Asian colonies. Another major influence was Vivekananda, who popularised his modernised interpretation of Advaita Vedanta in the 19th and early 20th century in both India and the west, emphasising anubhava ("personal experience") over scriptural authority.

Appraisal and criticism

Appraisal
According to Larson, the "solution of synthesis" prevailed in the work of Rammohun Roy, Sayyid Ahmed Khan, Rabindranath Tagore, Swami Vivekananda, M.K. Gandhi, Muhammad Ali Jinnah, Muhammad Iqbal, V.D. Savarkar, Jawaharlal Nehru, "and many others". Spear voices appraisal of this "solution of synthesis", while G.R. Sharma emphasises the humanism of neo-Vedanta.

Criticism
Vivekenanda's presentation of Advaita Vedanta has been criticised for its misinterpretation of this tradition:

According to Anantanand Rambachan, Vivekananda emphasised anubhava ("personal experience") over scriptural authority, but in his interpretation of Shankara, deviated from Shankara, who saw knowledge and understanding of the scriptures as the primary means to moksha. According to Comans, the emphasis on samadhi also is not to be found in the Upanishads nor with Shankara. For Shankara, meditation and Nirvikalpa Samadhi are means to gain knowledge of the already existing unity of Brahman and Atman.

In the 21st century, Neo-Vedanta has been criticized by Hindu traditionalists for the influence of "Radical Universalism", arguing that it leads to a "self-defeating philosophical relativism," and has weakened the status and strength of Hinduism.

Criticism of neo-Hinduism label

Criticism of Paul Hacker
In the 20th century the German Indologist Paul Hacker used the terms "Neo-Vedanta" and "Neo-Hinduism" polemically, to criticize modern Hindu thinkers. Halbfass regards the terms "Neo-Vedanta" and "Neo-Hinduism" as "useful and legitimate as convenient labels", but has criticized Hacker for use that was "simplistic". Furthermore, he asks,

Halbfass wrote that the adoption of the terms 

Bagchee and Adluri argue that German Indology, including Hacker, was merely "a barely disguised form of religious evangelism".

According to Malhotra, an Indian-American Hindu writer, it was Paul Hacker who popularized the term 'neo-Hinduism' in the 1950s, "to refer to the modernization of Hinduism brought about by many Indian thinkers, the most prominent being Swami Vivekananda." In Malhotra's view, "Hacker charged that 'neo-Hindus', most notably Vivekananda, have disingenuously adopted Western ideas and expressed them using Sanskrit." Malhotra also notes that Hacker was a biased Christian apologist: 
According to David Smith, Hacker's belief was that the ethical values of 'neo-Hinduism" came from Western philosophy and Christianity, just in Hindu terms. Hacker also believed that Hinduism began in the 1870s. He saw Bankin Chattopadhyaya, Aurobindo, Gandhi, and Radhakishnan as its most famous proponents.

Neglect of inherent development of religions
Brian K. Smith notes that "The Neo-Hindu indigenous authorities are often dismissed as 'inauthentic,' their claims to legitimacy compromised by their encounters with modernity", which influenced their worldview and religious positions, but points out that 

According to Madaio, the notion that Vivekananda and other Hindu modernists deviate from orthodox, classical Advaita Vedanta, neglects the fact that considerable developments took place in Indian religious thinking, including Advaita Vedanta.

The "myth of Neo-Hinduism"
Rajiv Malhotra, in his book Indra's Net, has stated that there is a "myth of Neo-Hinduism". According to him, there are "eight myths" of Neo-Hinduism such as "colonial Indology's biases were turned into Hinduism" (Myth 2) and "Hinduism was manufactured and did not grow organically" (Myth 3). Malhotra denies that "Vivekananda manufactured Hinduism", or that `neo-Vedanta' suppressed "the traditions of the Indian masses." According to Malhotra, there is "an integrated, unified spiritual substratum in ancient India," and argues that

According to Malhotra, the 'myth of neo-Hinduism' "is used to fragment Hindu society by pitting its spiritual giants against one another and distorting their subtle and deeply intricate viewpoints." Also according to him, "the definition of neo-Hinduism has been contrived and [...] gained authenticity, in part because it suits certain academic and political agendas, and in part because it has been reiterated extensively without adequate critical response."

See also

 Vijnanabhiksu
 Bengali Renaissance
 Hindu reform movements
 Hindu nationalism
 Indigenous Aryans (Out of India theory)
 Sanskritization
 Indo-Aryan migrations
 Hinduism in the West
 Buddhist modernism
 Zen Narratives

Notes

References

Sources

Printed sources

Web-sources

Further reading
 
  (266 pages), paperback
 
 
 
 

Scholarly
 
 

Apologetic

External links

International Forum for NeoVedantins

History
Bithika Mukerji, Neo-Vedanta and Modernity
Kelamuni, The Neo-Vedanta of Swami Vivekananda: Part One
Kelamuni, The Neo-Vedanta of Swami Vivekananda: Part Two
Swami Bhajanananda (2010), Four Basic Principles of Advaita Vedanta

Criticism
Frank Morales, Neo-Vedanta: The problem with Hindu Universalism
DharmaCentral.com, A Devastating Critique of Neo-Hinduism 

 
Hindu philosophical concepts
19th-century Hinduism
Advaita
Nondualism